Moehringia is a genus of flowering plants in the family Caryophyllaceae.  Members of this genus and of some other genera in Caryophyllaceae are commonly called sandworts. They are found only in the north temperate zone. The genus Moehringia was first formally named by Carl Linnaeus in 1753. It is named after the German naturalist Paul Möhring (1710–1792).

Its type species is Moehringia muscosa. By 1992, there were 31 recognized species. In 2007, Fior and Karis transferred four species from Moehringia to Arenaria, leaving Moehringia with 27 species. M. fontqueri, M. intricata, M. tejedensis, and M. glochidisperma were renamed A. funiculata, A. suffruticosa, A. tejedensis, and A. glochidisperma, respectively.

Species
Species include:
 Moehringia lateriflora 
 Moehringia macrophylla
 Moehringia muscosa
 Moehringia trinervia
 Moehringia villosa
 22 more

References

 
Caryophyllaceae genera
Taxonomy articles created by Polbot